Higher Plane is a gospel album by Al Green, released in 1981.

Track listing
"Higher Plane" (Keith Anthony Burke, Marshall Jones) - 3:37
"People Get Ready" (Curtis Mayfield) - 6:23
"By My Side" (Johnny Brown, Morgan Joseph) - 4:18
"The Spirit Might Come - On and On" (Burke, Joseph) - 5:23
"Where Love Rules" (Burke, Jean Burleson) - 5:13
"Amazing Grace" - 3:31
"His Name Is Jesus" (Burke, Burleson) - 5:26
"Battle Hymn of the Republic" - 2:32

Personnel 
 Al Green – lead and backing vocals, string arrangements
 Jesse Butler – keyboards 
 Larry Lee – lead guitars 
 Reuben Fairfax Jr. – bass 
 Aaron Purdy – drums 
 Jerry Peters – string arrangements 
 Marjie Joseph – backing vocals 
 Laura Lee – backing vocals
 Wanda Neal Bobo – backing vocals 
 James Nelson – backing vocals

Production 
 Producer – Al Green
 Engineers – Bill Cantrell and Fred Jordan
 Recorded at American Music Recording Studios (Memphis, TN).
 Coordinator – Jesse Butler
 Design – Dennis Hill
 Photography – Alan Messer

References

Al Green albums
1982 albums
Gospel albums by American artists